Mariano Recalde (born 8 April 1972) is an Argentine lawyer and Justicialist Party politician. He currently serves as a National Senator for the Autonomous City of Buenos Aires since December 2019, representing the Frente de Todos. He previously served as a Legislator at the Buenos Aires City Legislature and as president of Aerolíneas Argentinas, Argentina's state-owned flag carrier airline from 2009 to 2015.

Early life and education
Recalde was born on 8 April 1972 in Buenos Aires. His father is the labour attorney and politician Héctor Recalde. He finished high school at the Colegio Nacional de Buenos Aires; he also served as president of the Colegio's student union. Like his father, Mariano studied law at the University of Buenos Aires (UBA) and then went on to complete specializations on labour law at the universities of Salamanca and Castilla–La Mancha in Spain.

Recalde also counts with a doctorate (PhD) on labour law from the University of Buenos Aires; his doctoral thesis was on "New trends in the relationship between state and collective norms and the new rules on competences and concurrences between collective bargaining agreements". He has served as auxiliary professor in the private law and labour law courses and as professor of collective labour law at the UBA.

Political career
Recalde is a founding member of La Cámpora. He is currently senator for the City of Buenos Aires by Frente de Todos. He was the president of Aerolíneas Argentinas since 2009 until December 2015. He won the 2015 primary elections of the Front for Victory for mayor of Buenos Aires; the party was ranked third in the election.

He has been a member of the Council of Magistracy of the Nation in representation of the Senate since 6 February 2020.

Personal life
Recalde has three children: María Eva (named after Eva Perón), Sara and Juan Pedro. He is a supporter of Boca Juniors.

References

1972 births
Living people
20th-century Argentine lawyers
Aerolíneas Argentinas
Justicialist Party politicians
Members of La Cámpora
Kirchnerism
Politicians from Buenos Aires
Members of the Buenos Aires City Legislature
Members of the Argentine Senate for Buenos Aires
Members of the Argentine Council of Magistracy
University of Buenos Aires alumni
University of Salamanca alumni
University of Castilla–La Mancha alumni